Zsana is a village in Bács-Kiskun county, in the Southern Great Plain region of southern Hungary.

Geography

External links 
 Hivatalos honlap 

Populated places in Bács-Kiskun County